Jacques Le Guen (born 8 March 1958 in Brest, Finistère) is a member of the National Assembly of France.  He represents the Finistère department,  and is a member of the Union for a Popular Movement.

References

1958 births
Living people
Politicians from Brest, France
Union for a Popular Movement politicians
United Republic politicians
Deputies of the 12th National Assembly of the French Fifth Republic
Deputies of the 13th National Assembly of the French Fifth Republic